Larry Wang or Wang Yu-yuan (born Kaifeng City, Henan Province, Republic of China, 1947) is a senior diplomat of the Republic of China (Taiwan). He is a native of Wujin County, Jiangsu Province. He is proficient in English and Spanish.

He was the 9th Republic of China Ambassador Extraordinary and Plenipotentiary to the Holy See.
He was previously the Representative of the Taipei Representative Office in the Netherlands.

Education

 1970  B.A. Department of Political Science,
 1973  Graduate School of Political Science, Chinese Culture University

Career timeline

 Ambassador Extraordinary and Plenipotentiary to the Holy See (Sep. 2008–December 2015)
 Representative of Republic of China (Taiwan) in the Kingdom of the Netherlands(Oct. 2006- Sep. 2008)
 Director General, Department of European Affairs,Ministry of Foreign Affairs, Republic of China(Oct. 2003-Oct. 2006)
 Representative of Republic of China (Taiwan) in Argentina (Sept. 1996-Sept. 2003)
 Chief of Protocol, Ministry of Foreign Affairs, Republic of China (Mar. 1994-Aug. 1996)
 Director-General of Congressional Affairs Division, Taipei Economic and Cultural Representative Office in USA (Washington DC)(Feb. 1991-Feb.1994)
 Deputy Director-General of Congressional Affairs Division, Taipei Economic and Cultural Representative Office in USA (Washington DC)(Feb. 1984-Feb.1991)
 Section Chief, Department of North American Affairs, Ministry of Foreign Affairs(Jun. 1981-Feb.1984)
 Director-General of General Affairs Division, Taipei Economic and Cultural Representative Office in USA (Washington DC)(Mar. 1979-Jan. 1980)
 Director-General of General Affairs Division, Embassy of the Republic of China in Washington DC (Jul. 1978-Feb, 1979)
 Third Secretary, Political Division, Embassy of the Republic of China in Washington DC (Jul. 1976-Jul. 1978)
 Senior Staff, Department of North American Affairs, Ministry of Foreign Affairs (May 1974-Jun. 1976)

Experience

Before entering the diplomatic service in 1974, Wang Yu-yuan worked in the Overseas Department of the Broadcasting Corporation of China (BCC) in Taipei as English reporter and Deputy Director of the Section for international programs;

He also worked for the Central Daily News in Taipei as editor and translator;

In 1976 he was assigned to the Embassy of the Republic of China (ROC) in Washington D.C., USA, as Third Secretary;
In 1994 he served as Chief of Protocol, ROC Ministry of Foreign Affairs;
In 1996 he was appointed Representative of the Republic of China in Argentina; 
In 2003 he served as Director-General of the Department of European Affairs, ROC Ministry of Foreign Affairs; 
In 2006 he took office as Representatives of Republic of China in the Kingdom of the Netherlands

Since September 2008 he has served as Ambassador Extraordinary and Plenipotentiary of the Republic of China to The Holy See.

Awards and decorations

In October 1995, Wang Yu-Yuan was awarded the Grand Officer of the Order of Antonio José de Irisarri by the President of Guatemala;
On July 3, 1996, he was awarded the “Orden Francisco Morazan” medal by the President of Honduras;
On September 26, 2008, he was awarded the Order of Brilliant Star with Special Grand Cordon by ROC President Ma Ying-jeou; 
On July 12, 2011, he was awarded the Knight Grand Cross of the Order of Pius IX by Pope Benedict XVI "(Latin: 'A Magna Crvce Eqvitem Ordinis Piani' );

On November 8, 2012, he was awarded the Grand Officer Cross pro Merito Melitensi by the Prince and Grand Master of the Sovereign Military Hospitaller Order of St.John of Jerusalem of Rhodes and of Malta, His Most Eminent Highness Fra' Matthew Festing, for his promotion of values and works of charity in the Christian tradition as defined by the Roman Catholic Church.

Embassy of the Republic of China and Taipei Representative Office in Washington D.C. tenure

In 1976, Wang Yu-yuan, who was part of the staff of the North American Affairs Department of the Ministry of Foreign Affairs, was assigned to the Embassy of the Republic of China in Washington D.C. as Third Secretary. Initially, he worked in the political section, but in August 1978, following the transfer to Taipei of Senior Secretary Huang Chun-chien (黃純謙), Head of General Affairs Section, Ambassador James Shen promoted him to Head of the General Affairs Section. Just a few months later, on December 15, 1978, US President Jimmy Carter announced that the United States would sever its diplomatic relations with the Republic of China. Wang was placed in charge of relocating the embassy and moving everything out of Twin Oakes. He was also responsible for what he described later on to be the "saddest day of his career": the flag-lowering ceremony in Twin Oaks on December 31 of the same year.  This event marked the beginning of a new chapter in the history of the Republic of China's representative offices in the United States.

In 1983, Fredrick Chien, ROC Vice Minister of Foreign Affairs, was appointed ROC Representative to Washington D.C., USA. In 1984, Chien brought Wang, then Section Chief of the Department of North American of the Ministry of Foreign Affairs, to his Representative Office to participate in the lobbying of the U.S. Congress for the interests of ROC. He kept this position for ten years. Following Chien's departure in July 1988, Ting Mao-shih succeeded Chien as Taiwan's Representative in Washington D.C.. Wang kept working for Ting until 1994. His smooth working style seemed to be appreciated by his superiors as evidenced by the fact that his name was quoted three times by within Chien's memoirs (錢復回憶錄).

The first quotation refers to the time when the ROC decided to accept the proposal of US President Ronald Reagan to provide a secret donation to Nicaragua rebels. In August 1985, Foreign Minister Chu Fu-sung asked Wang to personally deliver an instruction to Chien, ROC Representative in Washington. (See Fredrick Chien Memoirs Volume II, page 436).

The second quotation refers to the period right before ROC President Chiang Ching-kuo's historical decision to lift martial law in 1986. In the month of July, Vice President Lee Teng-hui's Secretary Su Chih-chien (蘇志誠) asked Wang to deliver a message from Taipei to Chien, who was very doubtful about its content. However, later in September, a long-distance call from Chiang Hsiao-yung, son of Chiang Ching-kuo, confirmed to Chien that Chiang Ching-kuo had decided to accept Chien's views to lift martial law in Taiwan. (See Fredrick Chien Memoirs Volume II page 362).

In August 1987, the United States took under consideration the idea of co-producing frigates with Taiwan. Two U.S. senators from the State of Maine-George Mitchell (Democrat) and William Cohen (Republican), confided Chien through Wang their hopes that Taiwan would choose Bath Iron Works Corporation, located in the State of Maine, as future US partner of this co-production project. (See Fredrick Chien Memoirs Volume II page 492).

In 1991, Ting promoted Wang, who took over Jason Yuan’s position, as Director-General of Congressional Affairs Division of ROC's representation in Washington D.C.. In this position, Wang made his greatest achievement. Thanks to the strategy devised by Ting, Wang brilliantly succeeded in a very short period of time in winning the support of a large number of both members of the U.S Senate and House for the sale of F-16 fighter planes to Taiwan. The strong support and Congressional resolutions of U.S. Congress contributed to President Bush’s announcement of the sale 150 F-16 fighter planes to the Republic of China on September 2, 1992.

Ministry of Foreign Affairs Chief of Protocol tenure

In March 1994, as Chief of Protocol of the ROC Ministry of Foreign Affairs, Wang accompanied President Lee Teng-hui(李登輝) in his first visit to  Central American countries, and South Africa. He also accompanied Vice President Lee Yuan-zu (李元簇)to his official visit to Panama and Guatemala, travelled with Premier Lien Chan(連戰) to the Dominican Republic and Panama; and joined Foreign Minister Fredrick Chien in his trip to the Caribbean countries.

In October 1995, Wang was awarded the "Orden Antonio Jose de Irisarri en el grado Gran Oficial" medal by the President of Guatemala.

On July 3, 1996, he was awarded the "Orden Francisco Morazan" medal by the President of Honduras.

ROC Ambassador to the Holy See tenure

On November 8, 2008, Wang Yu-yuan presented his Letters of Credence to Pope Benedict XVI as the ninth ROC Ambassador Extraordinary and Plenipotentiary to the Holy See, (the “Vatican”), in order to take care of Catholics in mainland China and to seek dialogue with the authorities on the Chinese mainland, Vatican's bilateral relations with ROC are quite subtle. Since the beginning of 1971, the Vatican lowered the ranking of the “Ambassador of the Pope” or “Apostolic Nuncio” to Chargé d'Affaires. In addition to the consolidation of diplomatic ties and to the active promotion of substantive relations, thanks to the tireless work of Wang Yu-yuan, on May 8, 2010, the ROC Ministry of Education officially recognized the degrees issued by 23 Pontifical Universities, Academies and Institutions in Rome, thereby solving a thorny issue that lasted over several decades. The diplomas of about eight hundred members of the clergy who have studies in Pontifical institutions in the past are now recognized.

On July 12, 2011, Pope Benedict XVI bestowed upon Ambassador Wang the “Knight Grand Cross of the Order of Pius IX” medal (Latin: A MAGNA CRVCE EQVITEM ORDINIS PIANI), the highest honor awarded to the ambassadors to the Holy See. The award ceremony was presided by the Chief of Protocol of the Holy See, Msgr. Fortunatus Nwachukwu, on behalf of the Pope.

On December 2, 2011, the ROC signed the first agreement with the Holy See in a seventy-year period, it was called “Agreement on the Collaboration in the Field of Higher Education and on the Recognition of Studies, Qualifications, Diplomas and Degrees.” According to President Ma Ying-jeou, this agreement helps making Taiwan “a centre of higher education for East Asia.” As a result, Catholic teaching will be part of the curricula of Catholic institutions. This agreement was the fruit of a year's work and saw the cooperation of the Vatican Congregation for Catholic Education, the bishops of Taiwan, Fu Jen Catholic University and other Catholic colleges. Msgr. Paul Russell, Vatican's Chargé d'Affaires in Tapei, said that "First of all, we had to find a common view among ourselves and then we worked closely with the Ministry of Education, of the Interior [which carries the portfolio on faith communities], the Foreign Ministry. We received enormous help from Taiwan’s Ambassador to the Holy See, Larry Wang, and President Ma Ying-jeou." The Agreement entered into force on December 17, 2012.

On February 11, 2013, Pope Benedict XVI’s announced retirement shocked the world, as a similar event last occurred 600 years earlier. The timing of Pope Benedict XVI’s announcement coincided with the Lunar New Year holiday period in Taiwan. Wang Yu-yuan, without previous authorization, through negotiations and exchanging of views with the Vatican, tried for nearly a month to succeed at what was regarded as an extremely difficult task: welcoming ROC President Ma Ying-jeou to attend Pope Francis’ installation ceremony. Wang finally got the Holy See to agree on his proposal. Ma Ying-jeou became the Republic of China's first President to ever attend a Pope's inauguration ceremony and the first ROC President to see the Pope. Ma Ying-jeou expressed his appreciation for Wang's effort and spoke highly of him.

See also
Embassy of the Republic of China to the Holy See  
China–Holy See relations
Foreign relations of Taiwan
Foreign relations of China
Foreign relations of the Holy See
Holy See–Taiwan relations
Republic of China Ambassador to the Holy See

References

External links
 Nov. 8, 2008 Ambassador Wang presented letter of Credence to Pope Benedict XVI
 Embassy of the Republic of China (Taiwan) to the Holy See

1947 births
Living people
Chinese Culture University alumni
Kuomintang politicians in Taiwan
Representatives of Taiwan to Argentina
Knights Grand Cross of the Order of Pope Pius IX
Ambassadors of the Republic of China
Ambassadors of China to the Holy See
Representatives of Taiwan to the Netherlands